

The Meridionali/Agusta EMA 124 was a light utility helicopter flown in prototype form in Italy in 1970. The design was undertaken by Agusta for production in a joint venture with Elicotteri Meridionali, based on the Bell 47 that Agusta was building under licence at the time.

The EMA 124 retained the Bell 47's dynamic components, tubular tail, and undercarriage, but was fitted with a new, more aerodynamic forward fuselage with a cabin to seat three. The fuel tank and engine installation were also "cleaned up", and the rotor omitted the stabiliser bars fitted to the Bell 47's rotor.

A single prototype was flown in 1970 (registration I-EMAF), but nothing further came of the project.

Specifications

Notes

References
 
 
 

1970s Italian civil utility aircraft
1970s Italian helicopters
Agusta aircraft
Aircraft first flown in 1970
Single-engined piston helicopters